is a 1984 Japanese film directed by Toshiya Fujita.

Synopsis
Joe Petrel (Umitsubame Joe) is a half-Filipino, half-Okinawan gangster who escapes to the Philippines after killing a mob boss. The film chronicles his misadventures with underworld characters and the police.

Cast
 Saburō Tokitō as Umitsubame Joe
 Miwako Fujitani as Yōko Tamaki
 Kunie Tanaka as Dosegashira
 Kentarō Shimizu as Sawai
 Yoshio Harada as Yonamine
 Toshiro Mifune as the Fisherman

Awards
9th Hochi Film Award
 Best Actor - Saburō Tokitō

References

External links

1984 films
Films directed by Toshiya Fujita
Shochiku films
1980s Japanese films